13 is a 2011 American psychological crime thriller film directed by Géla Babluani (who also directed the original), stars Sam Riley, Ray Winstone, 50 Cent, Mickey Rourke and Jason Statham. It is a remake of the 2005 Georgian-French film 13 Tzameti.

Plot
Vincent "Vince" Ferro overhears people talking about a dead man who was going to start a well-paid job. Ferro, in need of money, steals an envelope containing the instructions for the job. He arrives at an event in a secluded place. He is ordered to strip, and his boot heels are cut off, in order to check for surveillance equipment. The organizers accept him for the job instead of the dead man. The job is participation in a series of Russian roulette games. There are several participants, identified by number. In each round, the participants have to spin the cylinder of their revolver, and shoot when the light of a special light bulb is switched on. The event is organized for the enjoyment of rich spectators, one of these spectators being Jasper Bagges, who places bets on who will survive. Bagges bets on his brother Ronald, who was brought from the mental institution.

In the first round, the participants each get one bullet in their revolver, they are arranged into a circle, and each has to aim his revolver at the man in front of him. Ferro tries to back out, but he is forced to participate. As #13, he survives the first round and fires his gun only after being threatened with death. In the second round, in which two bullets are placed in each gun, Ferro survives only because the man behind him is killed before he could fire. In the third round, with three bullets in each gun, Ferro again survives, along with four other men. Ferro is one of two survivors randomly chosen to participate in a duel. The three others are finished and get a large sum of money. One of them, Patrick Jefferson, who was brought from prison to compete, is surprised that he is free to go, and he is escorted out by Jimmy, one of the employees. Jimmy then tries to kill Jefferson, attempting to steal a map Jefferson has, leading to money he has stashed from a robbery. Another employee catches Jimmy in the act, and demands that he stop, insisting that nobody is allowed to harm the surviving players. Jefferson collects his belongings and leaves.

Against the odds, Ferro wins the duel and gets $1,850,000 (USD). He also learns that his opponent won his last 3 duels. He collects his winnings and sneaks away from the mansion, arriving at a train station. When he spots police closing in on him, he stashes his winnings in a garbage can. After being interrogated by the police, he retrieves the money and sends it to his family, via registered mail, and buys a toy for his sister's birthday. However, on the way home, he is shot by Jasper, partly in revenge for Ferro having killed Ronald, and partly to steal the money, as he thinks Ferro still has the money with him. Jasper escapes with the money bag, not knowing that it only contains the toy.

Cast
 Jason Statham as Jasper Bagges, a wealthy British man who bets on the competition and has a peculiar interest in one of the competitors.
 Sam Riley as Vincent "Vince" Ferro; a naive young man who stumbles into the competition.
 Ray Winstone as Ronald Lynn Bagges, a competitor who has been sprung from a mental institution to participate.
 Curtis "50 Cent" Jackson as Jimmy, an employee assigned to escort Rourke's character to the bloody game.
 Mickey Rourke as Patrick Jefferson (originally Jesse James Jefferson), a Texan Cowboy broken out of a Mexican jail and sold into the competition.
 David Zayas as Detective Mullane, a cop on the trail of the illegal game. Ray Liotta was originally cast. Zayas met with director Géla Babluani about a part but nothing came out of it. After Liotta dropped out, Babluani called Zayas back and offered him the role.
 Emmanuelle Chriqui as Aileen.
 Michael Shannon as Henry.
 Ben Gazzara as Schlondorff.
 Alexander Skarsgård as Jack.
 Gaby Hoffmann as Clara Ferro, Vincent's sister.
 Michael Berry Jr. as William
 Chuck Zito as Ted

The film features Mickey Rourke, Jason Statham and David Zayas, who all starred in The Expendables which was released before this film.

Production
The film was directed and written by Géla Babluani, who directed and wrote the original film. A trailer was released in August 2010. Filming began on November 17, 2008, in and around New York City.

Reception
13 received critically negative reviews. On Rotten Tomatoes, it has an 8% rating, stating that only 1 out of the 13 reviews for the film was positive, with an average score of 3.8/10.

The New York Times film critic Stephen Holden considered 13 "a blustering, bad cartoon." V.A. Musetto of the New York Post criticized the film for being shot in color rather than the original's black and white, and for the addition of character back stories, "which serve only to slow the film’s momentum." The Hollywood Reporter said "Géla Babluani's English-language remake of his French debut loses the source's gritty, mysterious gloom."

References

External links
  
 
 
 
 

2010 films
2010 psychological thriller films
American thriller drama films
American remakes of French films
Films about death games
Battle royale
Hood films
2010s English-language films
Films shot in New York City
American psychological thriller films
2010 thriller drama films
2010s American films